Below is given a chronological record of tribal and peasant revolts in India before independence from British rule in the 1947. The list covers those tribal uprisings that occurred during the period of British rule in India.

18th century
1766-71 - Chuar rebellion led by Jagannath Singh first tribal revolt in India. Mishra, Asha; Paty, Chittaranjan Kumar (2010). Tribal Movements in Jharkhand, 1857-2007. Concept Publishing Company. ISBN 978-81-8069-686-2.; 
1770-1787 - Chakma revolt in Chittagong Hill Tracts.
1771-1809 - Chuar revolt by Bhumij tribes of Jungle Mahals.
1774-1779: Halba Dongar by Halba tribes in Bastar state against British armies and the Marathas.
1778: Revolt of the Paharia Sardars of Chota Nagpur against the British.
1784-1785: Uprising of the Mahadev Koli tribes in Maharashtra and Tilka Manjhi of Santal Tribe.
1789: Revolt of the Tamar of Chotanagpur against British.
1794-1795: The Tamars revolted again.
1798: The revolt of the tribals against the sale of Panchet estate in Chotanagpur.
1798-1799: Chuar rebellion led by Durjan Singh.

19th century
1812: The Kurichiyar and Kurumbar rebelled in Wayanad.
1825: Singphos attacked and set fire to the British magazine at Sadiya in Assam.
1828: Singphos Chief attacked Sadiya with 3000 tribal warriors.
1831-1832: Kol uprising of Kol tribals including the Ho, Oraon, Bhumij and Munda people in Chota Nagpur.
1832-1833: Bhumij revolt in Birbhum under Ganga Narayan Singh.
1843: Singpho Chief Nirang Phidu attacked the British garrison and killed several soldiers.
1849: Kadma Singpho attacked British villages in Assam and was captured.
1850: The Khond tribe revolted in Orissa Tributary States under leadership of chief Bisoi. 
Telanga Kharia rebelled in Chotanagpur Division.
1855-1856: The Santal Hul by the Santhal community against the British in Rajmahal Hills led by Sido and Kanho.
1857: Chero and Kharwar revolt in Chota Nagpur as part of the wider 1857 Rebellion.
1857-1858: The Bhil revolted between the Vindhya and Satpura ranges under the leadership of Bhagoji Naik and Kajar Singh as part of the 1857 rebellion.
 1859: The Andamanese in the Battle of Aberdeen.
1860: The Mizo raided Tripura state and killed 186 British subjects.
1860-1862: The Synteng revolt in the Jaintia Hills in Eastern Bengal and Assam.
1861: The Juang community revolted in Orissa.
1862: The Koya community revolted in the Godavari district against Muttaders.
1869-1870: The Santhals revolted at Dhanbad against a local monarch. The British mediated to settle dispute.
1879: The Naga revolted in Assam.
1879: The Koya revolted at Malkangiri in the Vishakapatnam Hill Tracts Agency under leadership of Tammandora.
1883: The Sentinelese tribal people of Andaman and Nicobar Islands in the Indian Ocean attacked the British.
1889: The mass agitation by the Munda against the British in Chota Nagpur.
1891: The Anglo-Manipuri war where the British conquered the kingdom of Manipur.
1892: The Lushai people revolted against the British repeatedly.
1899-1900: Revolt by the Munda tribal community under leadership of Birsa Munda (The Ulgulan).

20th century
1910: Bastar rebellion in Bastar state of the Central Provinces of Berar.
1913-1914: Tana Bhagat movement in Bihar.
1913: Revolt of Bhils in the Mangarh Hills of the Aravalli Range.
1917-1919: Kuki Uprising in Manipur against British colonial rule under the leadership of their chieftains called haosa.
1920-1921: Tana Bhagat movement happened again.
1922: The Koya tribal community revolted at in the Godavari Agency against the British under leadership of Alluri Sitarama Raju.
1932: The Nagas revolted under leadership of 14-year old Rani Gaidinliu in Manipur.
1941: The Gond and the Kolam revolted in collaboration against British Government in the Adilabad district of Hyderabad state.
1942: Tribal revolt under leadership of Lakshmana Naik at Koraput in Jeypore state.
1942-1945: The tribes of Andaman and Nicobar islands revolted against occupation of their islands by Japanese troops during World War II.

References

Khan, Ismail. 1986-Indian tribe through the ages. Vikas publishing house, New Delhi.
Gautam Bhadra. 1975. "The Kuki (?) Uprising (1917-1919): Its causes and Nature," Man in India, vol.55,1, pp. 10–56
Pattnaik .B. K., 2013. Tribal Resistance Movements and the Politics of Development Induced Displacement in Contemporary Orissa, Social Change, Vol. 43(1), pp 53–78
Baviskar Amita. (1995). In the belly of the river, tribal conflict over development in the Narmada valley. New Delhi: Oxford University Press.
Das, Vidhya (2001). Mining bauxite, maiming people, Economic and Political Weekly, 36(28), July 14–20: 2612–14
Oliver-Smith Anthony (2001). Displacement, resistance and the critique of development: From the grassroots to the global, Final report prepared for ESCOR R7644 and Research Programme on Development Induced Displacement and Resettlement, Refugee Studies Centre, University of Oxford

Rebellions in India
Political uprisings in India